Statistics of UAE Football League for the 1988–89 season.

Overview
It was contested by 12 teams, and Sharjah FC won the championship.

League standings

References
United Arab Emirates - List of final tables (RSSSF)

UAE Pro League seasons
United
1988–89 in Emirati football